Rabia and Olivia is a 2023 Indian Hinglish -language film. The film starring Sheeba Chaddha, Nayab Khan, Helena Prizen Klague, Mustafa Sheikh, Shadab Khan.

Production
The drama film is produced under the banner of Synchron Entertainment,produced by Yousef Sheikh, Co-produced by Tamara Gazzaz. The film is directed, story, screenplay and dialogue by Shadab Khan.The producer Yousef Sheikh has also given the screenplay and dialogue in the film.Music and lyrics are given by Ripul Sharma and background score by Jeorge Joseph. The film has been shot in Toronto, Mumbai and Aurangabad.The film will release on 24 February 2023.

Plot
Rabia and Olivia is a story of a child and her care-taker.
How the bond between two grows into a bond of mother and daughter and how there is drastic change in the behaviour of Olivia under the Rabiya's care.
But due to some unthoughtful events,Rabiya got arrested and there start an online campaign in the justice of Rabiya.

The intensity and fire in their efforts is so overwhelming that gradually more and more people, join them in support of their noble mission. Ultimately, on the grounds of humanity, media, politicians and common people come together in the form of a humanity and made Rabiya meet Olivia.

Cast
 Nayab Khan
 Helena Prinzen Klague
 Sheeba Chaddha
 Mustafa Sheikh
 Afroz Khan 
 Shadab Khan

Reception
The film Rabia and Olivia received overwhelming reviews . Rounak Kutecha of Times of India has given three star and quoted it as universal story.  Subuddhi Prajapti of OTT Play has also given three star and written that it is a beautiful story. Media house like Movies talkies, Latestly and Navbharat also have given good reviews.
Although the film does not have  any big names but the story and the performance of the casts have made it an outstanding film and made it to gather positive reviews.

References

External links
 Rabia and Olivia
 RABIA AND OLIVIA
 Rabia and Olivia (2023) Hindi Movie| Review, Budget and Box Office Collection | Sheeba Chaddha, Nayab Khan, Helena Prinzen-Klages

2023 films
Hindi-language drama films
Indian drama films